Ryan Fletcher (born 1983) is a Scottish actor.

Early life
Fletcher grew up in Blantyre, Glasgow, born to Stevie and Lorna Fletcher.

Career
Fletcher appeared in the stage show Black Watch for the National Theatre of Scotland (2007-8), had a leading role in the show The Infamous Brothers Davenport, and has appeared on television in River City, Taggart, and Limmy's Show. He plays "Dave Boy" in the television production, Pennyworth, which premiered 28 July 2019, on Epix.

References

External links 

Living people
People from Blantyre, South Lanarkshire
Scottish male soap opera actors
1982 births